Phil Lam Yik-hong (born 12 June 1985 as Lam Hon Fai) is a Canadian-born Hong Kong artist and sing-songwriter. Born in Nanaimo and raised in Qualicum Beach, he signed a contract with Sony Music Hong Kong in 2009. He rose to fame in Hong Kong in 2014 with the song Hills and Valleys, which earned him a Top 20 Gold Song Award in the 2014 Jade Solid Gold Best Ten Music Awards Presentation.

Career

Early stages of his career: 2007 to 2011 
In 2007, Phil Lam participated the Vancouver qualification for the New Talent Singing Awards. Later, he represented Vancouver to participate in the New Talent Singing Awards.

In 2009, he signed a contract with Sony Music Hong Kong to be a singer-songwriter.  Originally, his debut will be in late 2009.  But thanks to the conflict of Sony Music Hong Kong with TVB, the plan was postponed.

In September 2010, Phil Lam finally debuted and released his first Mandarin song, Rain Fell on the Ground . On 11 November 2010, he held his first concert, Listen · Phil Lam Showcase.  He also released his first EP, Loaded on 25 November 2010.

In 2011, Phil released a song, Infinity with Jason Chan.

Poor-performing period: 2012–2013 
In 2012, Phil releases his first album, Phil Lam, this album contains all songs from his previous EP, Loaded, but he only sent the song Things to be Completed Before 30 Years Old to the radio.  He did not release any album or singles in 2013.

He became famous: 2014 to 2016 
In 2014, he released his second EP, 3. He was noticed by the song Hills and Valleys and the music video of the song is one of the most watched Cantopop music videos on YouTube.

In 2015, he released his second album, Someone Echoes() and sent the songs Song of Praise, Andersen's Fault and Someone Echoes.  He also released a song, A New Daywith Robynn &amp; Kendy.  The music videos of Andersen's Fault and Someone Echoes got around 5 million views on YouTube each.

Stably Important: 2017 to this day 
February 2017, he held a 3-day concert at Macpherson Stadium named PHIL LIKE LIVE 2017.  He also released his third album, Songs of Love.  One of the song in the album, Once in a Blue Moon became a top hit on the radio and the music video got more than a million views on YouTube.

In the middle of 2017, he released 3 songs, It is Good to Have Tears, Resting and Not Working Today and Grassland.  He also released an EP at the end of that year, My Taste of Life, and held the Grassland Concert.

Songwriting Works For Other Singers
As Composer:
"Dear my friend," by Keung To (2021) 
"第一個迷" by Jeffrey Ngai (2022)

References

External links
Phil's YouTube Channel

University of British Columbia alumni
Sony Music artists
Canadian expatriates in Hong Kong
Hong Kong male singers
1985 births
Living people
Canadian-born Hong Kong artists
Sony Music Hong Kong artists